Amalosia lesueurii, commonly known as Lesueur's gecko or Lesueur's velvet gecko, is a species of gecko, a lizard in the family Diplodactylidae. The species is endemic to Australia.

Etymology
The specific name, lesueurii, is in honor of French naturalist Charles Alexandre Lesueur.

Description
A. lesueurii is a small gecko. It is a mottled grey colour.

Geographic range
A. lesuerii is found near the eastern coastline of New South Wales and Queensland.

Behaviour
Although it is perhaps the most common gecko in the Sydney region, A. lesuerii is rarely observed unless it is disturbed. During the day it hides under close-fitting rocks, and comes out at night to hunt insects.

References

Further reading
Boulenger A (1885). Catalogue of the Lizards in the British Museum (Natural History). Second Edition. Volume I. Geckonidæ ... London: Trustees of the British Museum (Natural History). (Taylor and Francis, printers). xii + 436 pp. + Plates I-XXXII. ("Œdura lesueurii ", p. 107 + Plate X, figure 2, drawing of underside of toe).
Cogger HG (2014). Reptiles and Amphibians of Australia, Seventh Edition. Clayton, Victoria, Australia: CSIRO Publishing. xxx + 1,033 pp. .
Duméril AMC, Bibron G (1836). Erpétologie générale ou Histoire naturelle complète des Reptiles, Tome troisième [Volume 3]. Paris: Roret. iv + 517 pp. (Phyllodactylus lesueurii, new species, pp. 392–393). (in French).
Wilson, Steve; Swan, Gerry (2013). A Complete Guide to Reptiles of Australia, Fourth Edition. Sydney: New Holland Publishers. 522 pp. .

Amalosia
Geckos of Australia
Reptiles described in 1836
Taxa named by André Marie Constant Duméril
Taxa named by Gabriel Bibron